Alfred Bloom (November 9, 1926 – August 25, 2017) was an American Shin Buddhism scholar, who pioneered Jōdo Shinshū studies in the English-speaking world.

Early life and education
Born on November 9, 1926 in Philadelphia, Pennsylvania, Bloom was the youngest child of Jewish parents.  At the time of Bloom’s birth, his mother had been a recent convert to an Evangelical tradition of Christianity, and he was raised in that religious setting.

After graduating from Germantown High School in 1944, he joined the United States Army.  He was sent first to Virginia Military Institute and then Basic Training, after which he was assigned to the University of Pennsylvania for a nine-month program in Japanese language.  

In 1946, Bloom was deployed to Japan, serving in the Allied Translator and Interpreter Service.  During this time, he promoted Evangelical Christianity and encountered the concept of Amida Buddha when a Christian minister explained a passage from the Christian scriptures by using Amida Buddha as an analogy. This sparked a lifelong interest that grew from curiosity to academic pursuit to personal faith, always through rigorous intellectual reflection and dialogue..

Alfred Bloom died on August 25, 2017, at St. Francis Hospice in Honolulu, Hawaii, aged 90.

Career
Bloom began his academic life at Eastern Baptist Theological Seminary (BA., Th.B.) from 1947 to 1951. During this time he began to question, and then to abandon, the fundamentalist approach to the Bible which he had previously held.

He completed his theological training at Andover Newton Theological School (B.D., S.T.M.) in Newton, Massachusetts in 1953.  While in seminary, he was encouraged to pursue his intellectual interests in the newly founded degree of Comparative Religious Studies at Harvard Divinity School. He received  a Fulbright grant to study in Japan (1957-1959) and was awarded his doctorate from Harvard Divinity School with his thesis "Shinran’s Gospel of Pure Grace" in 1963.

From 1959 to 1961, Bloom was proctor for Center for the Study of World Religions, Harvard Divinity School, and Teaching Fellow in History of Religion, Harvard Divinity School. For a time, in 1961, he was lecturer in the History of Religion at Newton Junior College in Newton, Massachusetts.

Bloom taught as a professor of Religion at the University of Oregon from 1961 to 1970, University of Hawaii at Manoa  from 1970 to 1986, and the Institute of Buddhist Studies where he served as Dean from 1986 to 1994.

Bloom became an active member of the Hawaii Betsuin in the 1970s and received Shin Buddhist ordination, Tokudo (1990) and Kaikyoshi (1994). He was given the posthumous title Ko-Toku-In Shaku Zen-Kyo.

Bloom was instrumental in establishing the Hawaii Buddhist Study Center; founded the Futaba Memorial Lectures; and supported the founding of the Pacific Buddhist Academy.  He received the Buddhist Promotion Society Award (1997), Living Treasures of Hawaii Award from the Honpa Hongwanji Mission of Hawaii (2002), and the 3rd Annual President's Award from the Institute of Buddhist Studies (2016).

Bibliography
The Shin Buddhist Classical Tradition: A Reader in Pure Land Teachings, Vols 1 & 2, (World Wisdom, 2013 & 2014)  (Vol 1),  (Vol 2)
The Essential Shinran: A Buddhist Path of True Entrusting, (World Wisdom, 2007) 
Living in Amida's Universal Vow: Essays on Shin Buddhism, (World Wisdom, 2004) 
Honen the Buddhist Saint: Essential Writings and Official Biography, (World Wisdom, 2006)[introduction] 
A life of serendipity : blown by the wind of Amida's vow, (American Buddhist Study Center, 2008) 
Yemyo Imamura: Pioneer American Buddhist (A Dharma Outreach of Honpa Honwanji Mission of Hawaii), (Buddhist Study Center Press, 2000) 
Religion & Man: Indian and Far Eastern Religious Traditions, (McGraw-Hill, 1998) 
Strategies for Modern Living, (Heian International, 1993) 
Shoshinge: The Heart of Shin Buddhism, (Honpa Hongwanji Mission of Hawaii, 1986) 
Tannisho: A Resource for Modern Living, (Buddhist Study Center Press, 1981) 
Shinran's Gospel of Pure Grace, (University of Arizona Press, 1965)
The Life of Shinran: A Journey to self acceptance, (Brill, 1968)

Titles
Professor Emeritus, University of Hawaii; Dean Emeritus, Institute of Buddhist Studies, Berkeley, California; Institute of Buddhist Studies Scholar of Jodo Shinshu Studies; Jodo Shinshu priest: ordained at Jodo Shinshu Hongwanji-ha, Kyoto; Posthumous title: Ko-Toku-In Shaku Zen-Kyo.

References

External links
 Dr. Bloom's web site
 Alfred Bloom: Life and Work

1926 births
2017 deaths
American Buddhists
American Buddhist studies scholars
Pure Land Buddhists
Converts to Buddhism from Christianity
University of Pennsylvania alumni
Palmer Theological Seminary alumni
Andover Newton Theological School alumni
Harvard Divinity School faculty
Buddhist writers
Traditionalist School
Writers from Philadelphia
Harvard Divinity School alumni
People related to Jōdo Shinshū
Shin Buddhists
21st-century American Jews